Asiagomphus nilgiricus, is a species of dragonfly in the family Gomphidae. It is found in South India.

See also
 List of odonates of India
 List of odonata of Kerala

References

Gomphidae
Insects described in 1922